Warwick Avenue is a London Underground station in Little Venice in the City of Westminster in northwest London. The station is on the Bakerloo line, between Paddington and Maida Vale stations, and is in Travelcard Zone 2.

History 
Warwick Avenue opened on 31 January 1915 on the Bakerloo tube's extension from Paddington to Queen's Park.

The ticket hall and its ticket machines were destroyed by fire overnight on 17 September 1985, causing the station to be closed for the day.

Location and layout 
The station is located at the junction of Warwick Avenue, Warrington Crescent and Clifton Gardens. For a time prior to its opening, the proposed name for the station was Warrington Crescent.

There is no surface building and the station is accessed by two sets of steps to a sub-surface ticket hall. It was one of the first London Underground stations built specifically to use escalators rather than lifts. A plain, utilitarian brick ventilation shaft has been built on the traffic island in the middle of the road to improve ventilation of the tunnels.

Connections
London Bus Routes 6, 46, 187 and 414 serve the station.

A regular waterbus service runs from nearby Little Venice along the Regent's Canal; during the summer months boats depart hourly towards London Zoo and Camden Lock.

In popular culture
The song "Warwick Avenue" by British singer Duffy makes reference to the station.

Gallery

References

External links

London Transport Museum Photographic Archive

Bakerloo line stations
Tube stations in the City of Westminster
Former London Electric Railway stations
Railway stations in Great Britain opened in 1915
Maida Vale
Stanley Heaps railway stations